Eirik Bye (born 19 September 1995) is a visually impaired Paralympic Nordic skier who won medals for Norway at the 2018 Winter Paralympics. His guide was Arvid Nelson.

References

External links 
 

1995 births
Living people
Norwegian male cross-country skiers
Cross-country skiers at the 2014 Winter Paralympics
Cross-country skiers at the 2018 Winter Paralympics
Paralympic cross-country skiers of Norway
Paralympic silver medalists for Norway
Paralympic bronze medalists for Norway
Medalists at the 2018 Winter Paralympics
Paralympic medalists in cross-country skiing